Riesbürg is a town in the district of Ostalbkreis in Baden-Württemberg in Germany.

The city has a beautifully restored 1847 synagogue.

References

Ostalbkreis